Slovakia competed at the 2022 World Games held in Birmingham, United States from 7 to 17 July 2022. Athletes representing Slovakia won one gold medal, one silver medal and two bronze medals. The country finished in 39th place in the medal table.

Medalists

Competitors
The following is the list of number of competitors in the Games.

Air sports

Slovakia competed in air sports.

Archery

Slovakia competed in archery.

Canoe marathon

Martin Nemček was scheduled to compete in canoe marathon. He did not start in both of his events.

Duathlon

Slovakia competed in duathlon.

Finswimming

Slovakia won one bronze medal in finswimming.

Karate

Slovakia won one bronze medal in karate.

Women

Kickboxing

Slovakia won one silver medal in kickboxing.

Muaythai

Slovakia won one gold medal in muaythai.

Powerlifting

Slovakia competed in powerlifting.

Water skiing

Slovakia competed in water skiing.

Notes

References

Nations at the 2022 World Games
2022
World Games